Santa Catarina da Fonte do Bispo is a civil parish in the municipality of Tavira, in the Portuguese Algarve. The population in 2021 was 1,873, in an area of 117.59 km2.

History
Santa Catarina lies midway between the important Roman port town of Santa Luzia da Tavira (named as Balsa in Roman times) and the Roman settlement of Sao Bras de Alportel.

The oldest record from this region, the Cartório Notarial de Tavira (of 10 April 1601) identified the organized settlement of Santa Catarina. The church was erected sometime in the 15th century, and complements the style of the parochial church of the Misericórida in Tavira, which itself was built at the end of the first half of that century. It is assumed that the parish was established sometime prior to the erection of the church. The oldest ecclesiastical records, the births, baptisms, marriages and deaths recorded from this parish correspond to evident from the Torre do Tombo, and situate the parish around 1632.

Fonte do Bispo was a toponymic name referenced as early as the 14th century. The parish was named from Saint Catherine of Alexandria, who perished in 307 AD, referring to a legend stating that an image of Catherine appeared at the fountain of the bishop: this gave rise to the regions name.

Created from the ecclesiastical parish in 1835, this local authority's records were lost prior to 1886.

Economy
The main economic activities of this parish are the production of olive oil, the ceramics industry (manufacture of tiles, tiles and bricks), rural tourism and distilleries (mainly medronho brandy) 

The conversion of the into a digital arts center is planned for 2026.

Geography

The famous Fonte do Bispo is located some distance from this road, along the rocky cliffs.

The parish, is intimately associated with the region's soils. The southern part of the parish, south of the EN 270, is based in limestone, characterized by superficial deposits that extend from the sub-soils. To the north, and parallel the limestone areas, is a narrow strip of red sandstone, known as the grés de Silves, locally referred to as arneiro or pedra amoladeira. To the north of this zone is a mountainous schist zone, with heavily carved valleys and rounded ridges.

The limestone formation is named the Barrocal, and is occupied by orchards, olive trees, almond trees, figs and vineyards, in addition to the cultivation of cereal crops and legumes. The red sandstone grés de Silves has also been used by locals for planting orchards, irrigated by rainwater collected from the slopes of the ridges. The ridge, including areas of the Barrocal and Arneiro, are alluvial zones; the mountains around these areas produce wheat, barley, vineyards and olive orchards.

The Barrocal and Arneiro are zones of disperse settlements, homes isolated from one another, while in the mountain regions, the land is broken by more dense groupings of settlements. Consequently, a toponymic reference to sites and mountain settlements prevail. A sítio is a determine area of the territory with disperse habitat, while the montes is a mountain-top locality, independent of the number of dwellings, but relying on its influence.

Local Festivals and Events
August 3rd. Saturday & Sunday - Vigil of Our Lady of Sorrows Catholics are invited to contemplate the seven sorrows of the Blessed Virgin Mary.

August 25 - Santa Catarina Fair - in 1813, the Santacatarinenses asked the Príncipe Regente for authorization to hold an annual fair in order, with the income of the respective territory, to increase the celebration that they already offered to Nossa Senhora das Dores (Our Lady of Sorrows). It is held over 4 days around the 25th. of the month.

November 11 - Saint Martin's Day - marks the arrival of winter, associated with men, the celebration of the maturation of the new wine, and roasted horse chestnuts. It is celebrated traditionally around a bonfire, and drinking a local light alcoholic beverage called água-pé, or the stronger jeropiga.

November 25 - Saint Catherine's Day - also marks the arrival of winter, associated with women. On the following Sunday a church procession around the village takes place in the afternoon.

Market Day - 4th. Sunday of every month.

Climate
Santa Catarina da Fonte do Bispo has a hot-summer Mediterranean climate with hot, dry summers and mild, wet winters. Its location lies between the Algarvian Barrocal, an inland, higher altitude karstic region, and serra towards the coast, making its winters slightly cooler and summers hotter than those experienced on the coast. Precipitation is also higher, with December being the wettest month.

Architecture
 Market of Santa Catarina de Fonte do Bispo, the Estado Novo-era market, was built in the nationalist style, by the architect Helbling for the Direcção dos Edifícios do Sul;

References

Freguesias of Tavira